Sawyer is a city in Pratt County, Kansas, United States.  As of the 2020 census, the population of the city was 89.

History
Sawyer was founded in about 1886. It was named for Warren Sawyer, a railroad official.

The first post office in Sawyer was established in June 1887.

Geography
Sawyer is located at  (37.498323, -98.683223).

Demographics

2010 census
As of the census of 2010, there were 124 people, 52 households, and 29 families residing in the city. The racial makeup of the city was 100.0% White. Hispanic or Latino of any race were 5.6% of the population.

There were 52 households, of which 30.8% had children under the age of 18 living with them, 46.2% were married couples living together, 7.7% had a female householder with no husband present, 1.9% had a male householder with no wife present, and 44.2% were non-families. 44.2% of all households were made up of individuals, and 25% had someone living alone who was 65 years of age or older. The average household size was 2.38 and the average family size was 3.48.

The median age in the city was 31 years. 34.7% of residents were under the age of 18; 8.9% were between the ages of 18 and 24; 19.3% were from 25 to 44; 24.3% were from 45 to 64; and 12.9% were 65 years of age or older. The gender makeup of the city was 50.0% male and 50.0% female.

2000 census
As of the census of 2000, there were 124 people, 57 households, and 40 families residing in the city. The racial makeup of the city was 100.00% White.

There were 57 households, out of which 14.0% had children under the age of 18 living with them, 66.7% were married couples living together, 1.8% had a female householder with no husband present, and 29.8% were non-families. 28.1% of all households were made up of individuals, and 14.0% had someone living alone who was 65 years of age or older. The average household size was 2.18 and the average family size was 2.60.

In the city, the population was spread out, with 13.7% under the age of 18, 8.1% from 18 to 24, 23.4% from 25 to 44, 35.5% from 45 to 64, and 19.4% who were 65 years of age or older. The median age was 47 years. For every 100 females, there were 87.9 males. For every 100 females age 18 and over, there were 87.7 males.

The median income for a household in the city was $24,688, and the median income for a family was $32,917. Males had a median income of $26,875 versus $22,083 for females. The per capita income for the city was $12,357. There were 12.5% of families and 17.1% of the population living below the poverty line, including 41.7% of under eighteens and 21.2% of those over 64.

Education
The community is served by USD 438 Skyline public school district.

Sawyer High School was closed through school unification. The Sawyer High School mascot was Eagles.

References

Further reading

External links
 Sawyer - Directory of Public Officials
 USD 438, local school district
 Sawyer city map, KDOT

Cities in Kansas
Cities in Pratt County, Kansas